Simple Kaur Bhumrah (born 20 March 1986) is an Indian weightlifter.  She won the silver medal in the Women's +75 kg category at the 2006 Commonwealth Games. She has acted in Oye Jassie.

Television
 Oye Jassie (2013)

References

Living people
Commonwealth Games silver medallists for India
Indian female weightlifters
1986 births
Place of birth missing (living people)
Commonwealth Games medallists in weightlifting
21st-century Indian women
21st-century Indian people
Weightlifters at the 2006 Commonwealth Games
Medallists at the 2006 Commonwealth Games